Middle Teton Glacier is on the northeast flank of Middle Teton in Grand Teton National Park, Wyoming. The alpine glacier is a popular mountaineering route for ice climbing and for access to the summit of Middle Teton and other peaks to the south. The glacier is at the west end of Garnet Canyon, which is the most popular route used by climbers ascending Grand Teton.

See also
 List of glaciers in the United States

References

Glaciers of Grand Teton National Park